The Château de Sainte-Mère is a 13th-century ruined castle in the commune of Sainte-Mère in the Gers département of France.

The castle was built at the time of the Treaty of Amiens (1279) by the Bishop of Lectoure, Géraud de Monlezun. It defended the frontier of the English possessions. The castle had a rectangular shape, with two towers attached to the north facade.

It has been listed since 1977 as a monument historique by the French Ministry of Culture.

See also
List of castles in France

References

External links
 

Monuments historiques of Gers
Ruined castles in Occitania (administrative region)